Grant Union High School may refer to:

Grant Union High School (John Day, Oregon)
Grant Union High School (Sacramento, California)